An orally disintegrating tablet or orally dissolving tablet (ODT) is a drug dosage form available for a limited range of over-the-counter (OTC) and prescription medications. ODTs differ from traditional tablets in that they are designed to be dissolved on the tongue rather than swallowed whole. The ODT serves as an alternative dosage form for patients who experience dysphagia (difficulty in swallowing) or for where compliance is a known issue and therefore an easier dosage form to take ensures that medication is taken. Common among all age groups, dysphagia is observed in about 35% of the general population, as well as up to 60% of the elderly institutionalized population  and 18-22% of all patients in long-term care facilities
 ODTs may have a faster onset of effect than tablets or capsules, and have the convenience of a tablet that can be taken without water. During the last decade, ODTs have become available in a variety of therapeutic markets, both OTC and by prescription.

History
Tablets designed to dissolve on the buccal (cheek) mucous membrane were a precursor to the ODT. This dosage form was intended for drugs that yield low bioavailability through the digestive tract but are inconvenient to administer parenterally, such as steroids and narcotic analgesics. Absorption through the cheek allows the drug to bypass the digestive tract for rapid systemic distribution. Not all ODTs have buccal absorption and many have similar absorption and bioavailability to standard oral dosage forms with the primary route remaining GI absorption. However, a fast disintegration time and a small tablet weight can enhance absorption in the buccal area. The first ODTs disintegrated through effervescence rather than dissolution, and were designed to make taking vitamins more pleasant for children. This method was adapted to pharmaceutical use with the invention of microparticles containing a drug, which would be released upon effervescence of the tablet and swallowed by the patient. Dissolution became more effective than effervescence through improved manufacturing processes and ingredients (such as the addition of mannitol to increase binding and decrease dissolution time). Catalent Pharma Solutions (formerly Scherer DDS) in the U.K., Cima Labs and Fuisz Technologies (whose founder Richard Fuisz went on to pioneer orally soluble films, a separate but related dosage form) in the U.S. and Takeda Pharmaceutical Company in Japan led the development of ODTs.

The first ODT form of a drug to get approval from the U.S. Food and Drug Administration (FDA) was a Zydis ODT formation of Claritin (loratadine) in December 1996. It was followed by a Zydis ODT formulation of Klonopin (clonazepam) in December 1997, and a Zydis ODT formulation of Maxalt (rizatriptan) in June 1998. The regulatory condition for meeting the definition of an orally disintegrating tablet is USP method 701 for Disintegration. FDA guidance issued in Dec 2008 is that ODT drugs should disintegrate in less than 30 seconds. This practice is under review by the FDA as the fast disintegration time of ODTs makes the disintegration test too rigorous for some of the ODT formulations that are commercially available.

Manufacturing/packaging
The processes used to manufacture orally disintegrating tablets include loose compression tabletting, a process which is not very different than the manufacturing method used for traditional tablets and lyophilization processes. In loose compression, ODTs are compressed at much lower forces (4 – 20 kN) than traditional tablets.  However, since ODTs are compressed at very low forces due to the need to them to be soft enough to disintegrate rapidly in the mouth, issues of material sticking to the die walls can be challenging.  Typically, as in most tablet blends, lubricants such as magnesium stearate are added to the blend to reduce the amount of material that may stick to the die wall.  Differences may be the use of disintegrating aids, such as crospovidone, and binding agents that aid in mouth feel, such as microcrystalline cellulose.  Primarily, ODTs contain some form of sugar such as mannitol, which typically serves as the major diluent of the ODTs, and is also the primary contributor to the smooth and creamy mouth feel of most ODTs. Lyophilized ODT  formulations may use proprietary technologies but can produce a tablet that has a faster disintegration rate, for example the Zydis ODT typically dissolves in the mouth in less than 5 seconds without water and Lyophilized Freeze drying tablets - ODT typically dissolves in the mouth in few seconds depending on the molecules and strength.
   
ODTs are available in HPDE bottles (Parcopa) or individually sealed in blister packs to protect the tablets from damage, moisture, and oxidation.  Because ODTs are soft in nature, the ability to successfully package an ODT in a bottle is difficult. However, CIMA Labs markets their Durasolv ODT as being able to be placed into bottle for commercial sale, while CIMA's Orasolv is marketed for blisters only.  Zydis ODT tablets manufactured by Catalent Pharma Solutions and Lyophilized Freeze drying tablets manufactured by Galien-LPS are delivered in a blister pack. The differences between the two CIMA products are proprietary, however, the primary difference is expected to be the use of microcrystalline cellulose (MCC), such as Avicel PH101, in the Durasolv product.  MCC serves multiple purposes in an ODT but in the case of CIMA's products, it acts as a binder, increasing the internal strength of the tablet and making it more robust for packaging in bottles.

ODTs currently or previously available

Advantages of ODTs 

Ved Parkash et al. note the following advantages of ODTs:

 they are easy to consume and as such are convenient for such patients as "the elderly, stroke victims, bedridden patients, patients affected by kidney failure, and people who refuse to swallow, such as pediatric, geriatric, and psychiatric patients";
 increased bioavailability (rapid absorption) due to pregastric absorption;
 don't require water to consume and thus suitable for "patient compliant for disabled, bedridden patients, and for travelers and busy people who do not always have access to water";
 good mouth feel;
 improved safety due to low risk of choking or suffocation during oral administration.

Disadvantages of ODTs 
Ved Parkash et al. lists the following disadvantages of ODTs:

 unpleasant taste;

 cost-intensive production process;
 lack of physical resistance in standard blister packs;
 limited ability to incorporate higher concentrations of active drug.

ODTs under development

See also
 Phagophobia - fear of swallowing
 Pnigophobia - fear of choking
 Sugar alcohol - a family of chemicals common in ODTs to enhance the mouth feel of the tablet as it disintegrates

References

Food and Drug Administration
Drug delivery devices
Dosage forms